Broomweed is a common name for several species of plants, including:

Amphiachyris amoena, also known as Texas broomweed
Amphiachyris dracunculoides, also known as annual broomweed, prairie broomweed, or common broomweed
Corchorus siliquosus, a tropical plant used to make brooms
Gutierrezia sarothrae, also known as perennial broomweed or broom snakeweed
Gutierrezia texana, also known as Texas snakeweed or matchweed
 Malvastrum coromandelianum
Scoparia dulcis, also known as sweet broomweed
Sida species, tropical plants used to make brooms
Triumfetta species, tropical plants used to make brooms